Unger Bros. or Unger Brothers (1872–1910) was a jewelry company in Newark, New Jersey, best known for their sterling silver Art Nouveau designs.

The company was established by five sons from a German immigrant family. The oldest founded a jewelry business between 1870-1872 and began the manufacture of sterling silver items in 1878. Other sons gradually joined the firm, among them a silversmith and an engraver whose brother-in-law became the leading artistic designer. The firm's best years were from 1895 to 1907; by 1901 it had just under 300 employees. The 1903, 1904 and 1906 catalogs show over 150 hatpin designs, more than half Art Nouveau. All told, their 1904 catalog included some 3,200 distinct items; they employed stamping machines to turn out many of their products. While most items were jewelry, the best-selling items were dresser sets. They also produced tableware such as trays and sauceboats.

Unger Bros. work is collected in the Brooklyn Museum, Memphis Brooks Museum of Art, Metropolitan Museum of Art, Newark Museum, and RISD Museum.

References 
 Unger Bros., Judith Levitan, Arthur Levitan, 2017. .
 Encyclopedia of American Silver Manufacturers, Dorothy T. Rainwater, Judy Redfield, Schiffer Pub., 1998, page 347. .
 The Industrial Directory of New Jersey, New Jersey Bureau of Industrial Statistics, 1901, page 150.
 American Hatpin Society article
 Unger Bros. jewelry photographs
 Vatican.com collection of Unger Bros. items for sale

American silversmiths
American jewelry designers
Companies based in Newark, New Jersey